Carlos Manuel Félix Moedas (born 10 August 1970) is a Portuguese civil engineer, economist and politician of the Social Democratic Party (PSD).

From 2014 until 2019, Moedas served as European Commissioner covering the portfolio of Research, Science and  Innovation under the leadership of President Jean-Claude Juncker. Between 2011 and 2014 he served as Secretary of State in the XIX Constitutional Government of Portugal.

In March 2021, Moedas announced his candidacy as Mayor of Lisbon in the 2021 local elections, and was elected on 26 September of the same year.

Early life and education
Moedas was born to a communist journalist and a seamstress in Beja, Alentejo, southern Portugal, in 1970. He studied at Lisbon University, graduating in 1993 with a degree in Civil Engineering from the Instituto Superior Técnico. He spent his final year studying at the ENPC (Paris) via the Erasmus Programme; he was one of the first Portuguese students to undertake an Erasmus exchange.

Professional career
After leaving university, Moedas worked as a project manager for the Suez Group in France between 1993 and 1998. He then took postgraduate studies at Harvard Business School, graduating in 2000 with the degree of MBA, after which he came back to Europe to work in mergers and acquisitions for Goldman Sachs. He then worked at Eurohypo Investment Bank in its Real Estate Investment Banking Division, before returning, in August 2004, to Portugal, when Moedas joined the real estate consulting company Aguirre Newman Portugal (now Savills Portugal) becoming Managing Partner until 2008, when he set up his own investment management company, Crimson Investment Management.

Political career
Following the Eurozone crisis, Moedas was appointed coordinator of the Social Democratic Party (PSD) Economic Research Unit. He and Eduardo Catroga led PSD negotiations in the run-up to Portugal's 2011 State Budget, following which he was selected by PSD to contest the Beja constituency in the legislative elections held on the 5th of June 2011.

Moedas was elected to Parliament, becoming the first PSD Member of Parliament for that district since 1995. The day after entering Parliament, on 21 June 2011, the Prime Minister appointed him to his Cabinet in the XIX Constitutional Government as Secretary of State.

Moedas oversaw EASME (Executive Agency for Small and Medium-sized Enterprises), the agency created to monitor and control the implementation of the structural reforms agreed in the context of the assistance programme by a troika composed of the European Commission, European Central Bank and the International Monetary Fund.

In 2014, Pedro Passos Coelho, Prime Minister of Portugal, nominated him as European Commissioner, and Moedas' name was approved by EC President-elect Jean-Claude Juncker on 1 September. On 1 November 2014, Moedas became European Commissioner for Research, Science and Innovation.

In March 2021, Moedas announced his candidacy as Mayor of Lisbon in the 2021 local elections, and was elected on 26 September of the same year. He took office on 18 October 2021.

Other activities
 European Council on Foreign Relations (ECFR), Member (since 2021)
 Aga Khan University, Member of the Chancellor’s Commission (since 2021) 
 Africa Europe Foundation (AEF), Member of the High-Level Group of Personalities on Africa-Europe Relations (since 2020)
 Friends of Europe, Member of the Board of Trustees (since 2020)
 Trilateral Commission, Member of the European Group (since 2020)
 UNESCO, Member of the Advisory Board of the "Futures of Education" Initiative (since 2019)
 Jacques Delors Institute, Vice-President (since 2020), Member of the Board of Directors (since 2019)
 Re-Imagine Europa, Member of the Advisory Board

Honours and awards
 Member of the Portuguese Academy of Engineering (2014)
 Commander of the Spanish Order of Civil Merit by the King Felipe VI of Spain (2015)
 Honorary Doctorate in Laws by the University of Cork (2016) 
Honorary Doctorate by ESCP Europe - École supérieure de commerce de Paris (2018)
 Honorary Fellow of the AAS - African Academy of Sciences (2018)
 Gold Medal from the Portuguese Order of Engineering (2019)

Publications 
 Amaro, N. L., Moedas, C. 2011. O Novo Paradigma do Investimento Imobiliário: Análise e estratégias para um sector-chave da economia. Sabedoria Alternativa
 Bogers, M., Chesbrough, H., Moedas, C. 2018. Open Innovation: Research, Practices, and Policies. California Management Review, Volume: 60 issue: 2, page(s): 5-16
 Moedas, C. "Vento Suão: Portugal e a Europa", Guerra e Paz, Lisboa, 2020.

See also
 XIX Constitutional Government of Portugal 
 List of Parliament members in Portugal 
 Petros Christodoulou
 Massimo Tononi

References

External links

 Biography on the European Commission website
 Article on Wall Street Journal by Carlos Moedas
 Article on Les Echos (French) by Carlos Moedas
 Article on Science Diplomacy and the European Union
 Article on California Management Review: Open Innovation: Research, Practices, and Policies by Marcel Bogers, Henry Chesbrough, Carlos Moedas

|-

|-

1970 births
École des Ponts ParisTech alumni
Goldman Sachs people
Government ministers of Portugal
Grand Officers of the Order of Prince Henry
Harvard Business School alumni
Living people
People from Beja, Portugal
Portuguese bankers
Portuguese business executives
21st-century Portuguese economists
Portuguese European Commissioners
Members of the Assembly of the Republic (Portugal)
Social Democratic Party (Portugal) politicians
University of Lisbon alumni
European Commissioners 2014–2019
Alumni of the Erasmus Programme
Mayors of Lisbon